Arkan Mubayed (born 28 March 1983 in Latakia) is a Syrian footballer who currently plays for Al-Yarmouk in Jordan.

References

External links
 Stats Goalzz.com

Living people
1983 births
Syrian footballers
Association football defenders
Expatriate footballers in Jordan
People from Latakia
Syrian expatriate footballers
Syrian expatriate sportspeople in Jordan
Syrian Premier League players